The NER Class G (LNER Class D23) was a class of 4-4-0 steam locomotives of the North Eastern Railway. It was designed by Thomas William Worsdell and introduced in 1887.

History
The engines were built as Class G1 2-4-0s. They had simple expansion cylinders, slide valves, and Joy valve gear. Twenty locomotives were built at Darlington Works in 1887-1888. They were initially classed as "G1" to leave the classification "G" available for a compound version. However, the compound version was not built and they were reclassified as "G" in 1914.

Modifications
Between 1900 and 1904, they were rebuilt as 4-4-0s.  At the same time, they were fitted with piston valves and Stephenson valve gear. Superheaters were fitted between 1913 and 1916.

Use
The engines were initially used for secondary passenger duties. By the time of the 1923 Grouping, they were working local passenger services.

Withdrawal
Withdrawals took place between 1929 and 1935 and none were preserved.

References

4-4-0 locomotives
G
Railway locomotives introduced in 1887
Scrapped locomotives
Standard gauge steam locomotives of Great Britain
Passenger locomotives